The Fight: Science Against Cancer is a 1950 Canadian-American short documentary film directed by Morten Parker. It was produced by the National Film Board of Canada for the Association of American Medical Colleges for the National Cancer Institute and the Department of National Health and Welfare, Canada. The Fight is a shortened version of The Challenge: Science Against Cancer. It covers the topic of cancer using animation.

It was nominated for an Academy Award for Best Documentary Short.

References

External links
Official Site (National Film Board of Canada)

The Challenge: Science Against Cancer at the United States National Library of Medicine

1950 films
1950 documentary films
1950 short films
English-language Canadian films
Canadian black-and-white films
Canadian short documentary films
National Film Board of Canada documentaries
Documentary films about cancer
Films produced by Guy Glover
1950s short documentary films
1950s English-language films
1950s Canadian films